Bande may refer to:

People
 Bande Ali Mia (1906–1979), Bangladeshi poet
 Bande Nawaz, Indian centenarian
 Hassane Bandé (born 1998), Burkina Faso football player

Places
 Bande, Belgium
 Bande, Niger
 Bande, Ourense, Galicia, Spain

Other
 Bande dessinée, Franco-Belgian comics

See also
 Banda (disambiguation)